Group D of the 1993 Federation Cup Americas Zone was one of four pools in the Americas zone of the 1993 Federation Cup. Four teams competed in a round robin competition, with the top two teams advancing to the play-offs.

Mexico vs. Uruguay

El Salvador vs. Puerto Rico

Mexico vs. Puerto Rico

Mexico vs. El Salvador

Uruguay vs. Puerto Rico

Uruguay vs. El Salvador

See also
Fed Cup structure

References

External links
 Fed Cup website

1993 Federation Cup Americas Zone